Stray Kids is a South Korean boy band under record label JYP Entertainment, formed through the reality show of the same name. The group consists of eight members: Bang Chan, Lee Know, Changbin, Hyunjin, Han, Felix, Seungmin, and I.N. The group debuted with their second extended play (EP) I Am Not on March 25, 2018 following their pre-debut EP Mixtape, consisting of music from the Stray Kids series and released in January 2018. The group released two more EPs in 2018—I Am Who in August and I Am You in October, with a positive commercial reception. The four EPs earned the group six new artist awards in 2018 and early 2019, including Best New Male Artist at the 2018 Mnet Asian Music Awards, Best New Artist at the 33rd Golden Disc Awards, and Rookie of the Year at the 28th Seoul Music Awards and 2018 Asia Artist Awards. I Am Who also gave Stray Kids their first bonsang nomination at the 33rd Golden Disc Awards, for the Disc Bonsang. In addition, its lead single, "My Pace", received a Global Fan's Choice nomination at the 2018 Mnet Asian Music Awards. In 2019, the group released two more EPs—Clé 1: Miroh in March and Clé: Levanter in December—with the former receiving a reissue titled Clé 2: Yellow Wood in June. Clé 1: Miroh gave Stray Kids their first daesang nomination at the 29th Seoul Music Awards, for the main award, and Album of the Year – 1st Quarter at the 2020 Gaon Chart Music Awards.

Stray Kids has also received two nominations for Artist of the Year, one at the Mnet Asian Music Awards and the other at the Genie Music Awards, and both in 2018. At the 2019 Asia Artist awards, Stray Kids won the Star15 Popularity Award, becoming the group's first popularity accolade.

Awards and nominations

Notes

References 

Stray Kids
Awards